Ko Eun-mi (born Ahn Eun-mi on July 7, 1976) is a South Korean actress. She made her entertainment debut in 1995 as a singer in the band T.Ra.V (stands for "TV+Radio+Video"), which released one album Hey! Henter before disbanding. Ko was then cast in the 1996 sitcom Three Guys and Three Girls, and has been acting full-time since 2001. She is best known for her roles in the television dramas Even So Love, Loving You a Thousand Times, Dangerous Woman and Lady Storm.

Filmography

Television series

Film

Discography

Awards and nominations

References

External links
 Ko Eun-mi at SidusHQ 
 
 

South Korean film actresses
South Korean television actresses
IHQ (company) artists
Living people
1976 births